Jonas Sakuwaha (born 22 July 1983) is a Zambian former professional footballer who played as a winger. He made 25 appearances scoring 2 goals for the Zambia national team between 2006 and 2014.

Club career
Sakuwaha began his career with ZESCO United.

Sakuwaha moved to French side FC Lorient on 1 September 2009. He signed on loan for Le Havre for the 2010–11 season, before moving to Sudan to play with Al-Merrikh for the 2011 season. He signed with Congolese club TP Mazembe in January 2013.

Sakuwaha returned to Zambia joining ZESCO United for the 2014 season.

In early 2017 he signed with Buildcon, newly promoted to the Zambian Premier League. A year later, he was released by the club.

International career
Sakuwaha made his international debut for Zambia in 2006. He played at the 2008 CECAFA Cup and the 2009 African Championship of Nations, but rejected a call-up to the squad for the 2010 Africa Cup of Nations. He was called up to Zambia's 23-man squad for the 2013 Africa Cup of Nations.

References

External links
 

1983 births
Living people
Association football wingers
Zambian footballers
Zambia international footballers
ZESCO United F.C. players
FC Lorient players
Le Havre AC players
Al-Merrikh SC players
TP Mazembe players
Buildcon F.C. players
Oman Club players
Ligue 1 players
2012 Africa Cup of Nations players
2013 Africa Cup of Nations players
Africa Cup of Nations-winning players
Zambian expatriate footballers
Zambian expatriate sportspeople in France
Expatriate footballers in France
Zambian expatriate sportspeople in Sudan
Expatriate footballers in Sudan
Zambian expatriate sportspeople in the Democratic Republic of the Congo
Expatriate footballers in the Democratic Republic of the Congo
Zambian expatriate sportspeople in Oman
Expatriate footballers in Oman
2009 African Nations Championship players
Zambia A' international footballers